Diospyros evena is a tree in the family Ebenaceae. Twigs dry to black. Inflorescences bear a solitary flower. The specific epithet  is from the Latin meaning "without veins", referring to the leaf's invisible veins. Habitat is freshwater swamp forests. D. evena is found in Sumatra and Borneo.

References

evena
Plants described in 1933
Trees of Sumatra
Trees of Borneo